Oudega may refer to:

 Oudega, Gaasterlân-Sleat, a village in Friesland, Netherlands
 Oudega, Smallingerland, a village in Friesland, Netherlands
 Oudega, Súdwest-Fryslân, a village in Friesland, Netherlands